Anti-Catholicism is hostility towards Catholics or opposition to the Catholic Church, its clergy, and/or its adherents. At various points after the Reformation, some majority Protestant states, including England, Prussia, Scotland, and the United States, turned anti-Catholicism, opposition to the Pope (anti-Papalism), mockery of Catholic rituals, and opposition to Catholic adherents into major political themes. The anti-Catholic sentiment which resulted from this trend frequently led to religious discrimination against Catholic communities and individuals and it occasionally led to the religious persecution of them (frequently, they were derogatorily referred to as "papists" or "Romanists" in Anglophone and Protestant countries.) Historian John Wolffe identifies four types of anti-Catholicism: constitutional-national, theological, popular and socio-cultural.

Historically, Catholics who lived in Protestant countries were frequently suspected of conspiring against the state in furtherance of papal interests. Their support of the alien pope led to allegations that they lacked loyalty to the state. In majority Protestant countries which experienced large scale immigration, such as the United States and Australia, suspicion of Catholic immigrants and/or discrimination against them frequently overlapped or was conflated with nativist, xenophobic, ethnocentric and/or racist sentiments (e.g. anti-Irish sentiment, anti-Italianism, Hispanophobia, and anti-Slavic sentiment, specifically anti-Polish sentiment).

In the Early modern period, the Catholic Church struggled to maintain its traditional religious and political role in the face of rising secular power in Catholic countries. As a result of these struggles, a hostile attitude towards the considerable political, social, spiritual and religious power of the Pope and the clergy arose in majority Catholic countries in the form of anti-clericalism. The Inquisition was a favorite target of attack. After the outbreak of the French Revolution in 1789, anti-clerical forces gained strength in some primarily Catholic nations, such as France, Spain, Mexico, and certain regions of Italy (especially in Emilia-Romagna). Certain political parties in these historically Catholic regions subscribed to and propagated an internal form of anti-Catholicism, generally known as anti-clericalism, that expressed a hostile attitude towards the Catholic Church as an establishment and the overwhelming political, social, spiritual and religious power of the Catholic Church, attacking the pope's power to name bishops and criticizing the perceived power of Catholic international orders such as the Jesuits.

In primarily Protestant countries

Protestant Reformers, including John Wycliffe, Martin Luther, Henry VIII, John Calvin, Thomas Cranmer, John Thomas, John Knox, Roger Williams, Cotton Mather, and John Wesley, as well as most Protestants of the 16th–19th centuries, identified the Papacy with the Antichrist. The Centuriators of Magdeburg, a group of Lutheran scholars in Magdeburg which was headed by Matthias Flacius, wrote the 12-volume Magdeburg Centuries in order to discredit the Papacy and lead other Christians to recognize the Pope as the Antichrist. The fifth round of talks in the Lutheran–Catholic dialogue notes,

Doctrinal works of literature which were published by the Lutherans, the Reformed churches, the Presbyterians, the Baptists, the Anabaptists, and the Methodists contain references to the Pope as the Antichrist, including the Smalcald Articles, Article 4 (1537), the Treatise on the Power and Primacy of the Pope (1537), the Westminster Confession, Article 25.6 (1646), and the 1689 Baptist Confession of Faith, Article 26.4. In 1754, John Wesley published his Explanatory Notes Upon the New Testament, which is currently an official Doctrinal Standard of the United Methodist Church. In his notes on the Book of Revelation (chapter 13), he commented: "The whole succession of Popes from Gregory VII are undoubtedly Antichrists. Yet this hinders not, but that the last Pope in this succession will be more eminently the Antichrist, the Man of Sin, adding to that of his predecessors a peculiar degree of wickedness from the bottomless pit."

Referring to the Book of Revelation, Edward Gibbon stated that "The advantage of turning those mysterious prophecies against the See of Rome, inspired the Protestants with uncommon veneration for so useful an ally." Protestants condemned the Catholic policy of mandatory celibacy for priests.

During the Enlightenment Era, which spanned the 17th and 18th centuries, with its strong emphasis on the need for religious toleration, the Inquisition was a favorite target of attack for intellectuals.

British Empire

Great Britain

Institutional anti-Catholicism in Britain and Ireland began with the English Reformation under Henry VIII. The Act of Supremacy of 1534 declared the English crown to be "the only supreme head on earth of the Church in England" in place of the pope. Any act of allegiance to the latter was considered treasonous because the papacy claimed to have both spiritual and political power over its followers. It was under this act that saints Thomas More and John Fisher were executed and became martyrs for the Catholic faith.

Queen Mary, Henry's daughter, was a devout Catholic and during her five years as queen (1553–1558) she tried to reverse the Reformation. She married the Catholic king of Spain and executed Protestant leaders. Protestants reviled her as "Bloody Mary".

Anti-Catholicism among many of the English was not only grounded in their fear that the pope sought to reimpose religio-spiritual authority over England, it was also grounded in their fear that the pope also sought to impose secular power over them in alliance with their arch-enemies France and Spain. In 1570, Pope Pius V sought to depose Elizabeth with the papal bull Regnans in Excelsis, which declared that she was a heretic and purportedly dissolved the duty of all of Elizabeth's subjects to maintain their allegiance to her. This rendered Elizabeth's subjects who persisted in their allegiance to the Catholic Church politically suspect, and it also made the position of her Catholic subjects largely untenable if they tried to maintain both allegiances at once. The Recusancy Acts, which made worship in the Anglican Church a legal obligation, date back to Elizabeth's reign.

Assassination plots in which Catholics were prime movers fueled anti-Catholicism in England. These plots included the famous Gunpowder Plot, in which Guy Fawkes and other conspirators plotted to blow up the English Parliament while it was in session. The fictitious "Popish Plot" involving Titus Oates was a hoax that many Protestants believed to be true, exacerbating Anglican-Catholic relations.

The Glorious Revolution of 1688–1689 involved the overthrow of King James II, of the Stuart dynasty, who favoured the Catholics, and his replacement by a Dutch Protestant. For decades the Stuarts were supported by France in plots to invade and conquer Britain, and anti-Catholicism persisted.

Gordon Riots 1780

The Gordon Riots of 1780 was a violent anti-Catholic riot in London against the Papists Act of 1778. Passed by Parliament, the new law was supposed to reduce official discrimination against British Catholics. Lord George Gordon, head of the Protestant Association, warned that the law would enable Catholics who were serving in the British Army to become a dangerous threat. The protest evolved into riots and widespread looting. Local magistrates feared reprisals and as a result, they did not enforce the riot act. The riots were not suppressed until the Army moved in and dispersed the crowds by shooting them, killing hundreds of rioters. The violence lasted from 2 June to 9 June 1780. Public opinion, especially in middle-class and elite circles, repudiated anti-Catholicism and lower-class violence, and it also rallied behind the government of Lord North. Demands for the establishment of a police force in London were subsequently made.

19th century

Anglo-French conflicts during the French Revolutionary and Napoleonic Wars, which lasted from 1793 until 1815, saw the rise of anti-Catholicism as an underlying method to unify the Protestant populations of England, Scotland and Wales. Permeating through all social classes, antagonism towards Catholicism became firmly enmeshed with British national identity. As noted by English historian Linda Colley in her seminal work Britons: Forging of a Nation 1707–1837, the "defensive unity brought on by war with a Catholic French 'other' helped transform Great Britain from a new and largely artificial polity into a nation with a strong self-image rooted in Protestantism."

Catholics in Ireland gained the right to vote in the 1790s but they were politically inert for another three decades. Finally, they were mobilized by Daniel O'Connell into majorities in most of the Irish parliamentary districts. They could only elect, but Catholics could not be seated in parliament. The Catholic emancipation issue became a major crisis. Previously anti-Catholic politicians led by the Duke of Wellington and Robert Peel reversed themselves to prevent massive violence. All Catholics in Britain were "emancipated" in the Roman Catholic Relief Act 1829. That is, they were freed from most of the penalties and restrictions they faced. Anti-Catholic attitudes continued, however.

Since 1945
Since World War II, anti-Catholic feeling in England has abated somewhat. Ecumenical dialogue between Anglicans and Catholics culminated in the first meeting between an Archbishop of Canterbury and a Pope since the Reformation when Archbishop Geoffrey Fisher visited Rome in 1960. Since then, the dialogue has continued through envoys and standing conferences. Meanwhile, both the nonconformist churches such as the Methodists, and the established Church of England, have dramatically declined in membership. Membership in the Catholic Church continues to grow in Britain, thanks to the immigration of Irish and more recently, the immigration of Polish workers.

Conflict and rivalry between Catholicism and Protestantism since the 1920s, especially since the 1960s, has centered on the Troubles in Northern Ireland.

Anti-Catholicism in Britain was long represented by the burning of an effigy of the Catholic conspirator Guy Fawkes during widespread celebrations of Guy Fawkes Night every 5 November. However, this celebration has lost most of its anti-Catholic connotations. According to Clive D. Field, only faint remnants of anti-Catholicism are found today.

Ireland

As punishment for the rebellion of 1641, almost all of the lands which were owned by Irish Catholics were confiscated and given to Protestant settlers. Under the Penal Laws, no Irish Catholic could sit in the Parliament of Ireland, even though some 90% of Ireland's population was native Irish Catholic when the first of these bans was introduced in 1691. Tensions between Irish Catholics and Protestants have been blamed for much of "The Troubles", an ethno-nationalist conflict in Northern Ireland.

During the 18th century, the Peep o' Day Boys, an agrarian association composed of Irish Protestants, engaged in numerous acts of anti-Catholic violence through County Armagh. These acts culminated in the Armagh disturbances, a period of intense sectarian conflict during the 1780's and 1790's between the Peep o' Day Boys and the Catholic Defenders. The Peep o' Day Boys would conduct early morning raids on Catholic homes to confiscate weapons, which Irish Catholics were forbidden from owning under the Penal Laws. This led to confrontations between them and the Defenders, which culminated in the Battle of the Diamond, a confrontation which saw six killed and many more wounded. Though the Orange Order would denounce the actions of the Peep o' Day Boys, further anti-Catholic violence would continue to erupt in Ireland in the years leading up the Irish Rebellion of 1798.

Laws which restricted the rights of Irish Catholics

The Great Famine of Ireland was exacerbated by the imposition of anti-Catholic laws. The laws had largely been reformed by 1793, and in 1829, Irish Catholics could again sit in parliament following the Act of Emancipation.

Northern Ireland

The state of Northern Ireland came into existence in 1921, following the Government of Ireland Act 1920. Though Catholics were a majority on the island of Ireland, comprising 74% of the population in 1911, they were a third of the population in Northern Ireland.

In 1934, Sir James Craig, the first Prime Minister of Northern Ireland, said, "Since we took up office we have tried to be absolutely fair towards all the citizens of Northern Ireland... They still boast of Southern Ireland being a Catholic State. All I boast of is that we are a Protestant Parliament and a Protestant State."

In 1957, Harry Midgley, the Minister of Education in Northern Ireland, said, in Portadown Orange Hall, "All the minority are traitors and have always been traitors to the Government of Northern Ireland."

The first Catholic to be appointed a minister in Northern Ireland was Dr Gerard Newe, in 1971.

In 1986, at the annual conference of the Democratic Unionist Party, MP for Mid Ulster William McCrea interrupted councillor Ethel Smyth when she said she regretted the death of Sean Downes, a 24-year-old Catholic civilian who had been killed by a plastic bullet fired by the RUC during an anti-internment march in Andersontown in 1984. McCrea shouted, "No. No. I'll not condemn the death of John Downes [sic]. No Fenian. Never. No". In Northern Ireland and Scotland, Fenian is used by some as a derogatory word for Roman Catholics.

Canada

Fears of the Catholic Church were quite strong in the 19th century, especially among Presbyterian and other Protestant Irish immigrants across Canada.

In 1853, the Gavazzi Riots left 10 dead in Quebec in the wake of Catholic Irish protests against anti-Catholic speeches by ex-monk Alessandro Gavazzi. The most influential newspaper in Canada, The Globe of Toronto, was edited by George Brown, a Presbyterian immigrant from Ireland who ridiculed and denounced the Catholic Church, Jesuits, priests, nunneries, etc. Irish Protestants remained a political force until the 20th century. Many belonged to the Orange Order, an anti-Catholic organization with chapters across Canada that was most powerful during the late 19th century.

A key leader was Dalton McCarthy (1836–1898), a Protestant who had immigrated from Ireland. In the late 19th century he mobilized the "Orange" or Protestant Irish, and fiercely fought against Irish Catholics as well as the French Catholics. He especially crusaded for the abolition of the French language in Manitoba and Ontario schools.

In response to the 2021 Canadian Indian residential school gravesite discoveries, numerous churches and monuments in Western Canada have been vandalized or burned down.

French language schools in Canada
One of the most controversial issues was public support for Catholic French-language schools. Although the Confederation Agreement of 1867 guaranteed the status of Catholic schools when they were legalized by provincial governments, disputes erupted in numerous provinces, especially in the Manitoba Schools Question in the 1890s and in Ontario in the 1910s. In Ontario, Regulation 17 was a regulation by the Ontario Ministry of Education that restricted the use of French as a language of instruction to the first two years of schooling. French Canada reacted vehemently and lost, dooming its French-language Catholic schools. This was a central reason for French Canada's distance from the World War I effort, as its young men refused to enlist.

Protestant elements succeeded in blocking the growth of French-language Catholic public schools. However, the Irish Catholics generally supported the English language position which was advocated by the Protestants.

Newfoundland
Newfoundland long experienced social and political tensions between the large Irish Catholic working-class, on the one hand and the Anglican elite on the other. In the 1850s, the Catholic bishop organized his flock and made them stalwarts of the Liberal party. Nasty rhetoric was the prevailing style elections; bloody riots were common during the 1861 election. The Protestants narrowly elected Hugh Hoyles as the Conservative Prime Minister. Hoyles unexpectedly reversed his long record of militant Protestant activism and worked to defuse tensions. He shared patronage and power with the Catholics; all jobs and patronage were split between the various religious bodies on a per capita basis. This 'denominational compromise' was further extended to education when all religious schools were put on the basis which the Catholics had enjoyed since the 1840s. Alone in North America Newfoundland had a state funded system of denominational schools. The compromise worked and politics ceased to be about religion and became concerned with purely political and economic issues.

Australia
The presence of Catholicism in Australia came with the 1788 arrival of the First Fleet of British convict ships at Sydney. The colonial authorities blocked a Catholic clerical presence until 1820, reflecting the legal disabilities of Catholics in Britain. Some of the Irish convicts had been transported to Australia for political crimes or social rebellion and authorities remained suspicious of the minority religion.

Catholic convicts were compelled to attend Church of England services and their children and orphans were raised as Anglicans. The first Catholic priests to arrive came as convicts following the Irish 1798 Rebellion. In 1803, one Fr Dixon was conditionally emancipated and permitted to celebrate Mass, but following the Irish led Castle Hill Rebellion of 1804, Dixon's permission was revoked. Fr Jeremiah Flynn, an Irish Cistercian, was appointed as Prefect Apostolic of New Holland and set out uninvited from Britain for the colony. Watched by authorities, Flynn secretly performed priestly duties before being arrested and deported to London. Reaction to the affair in Britain led to two further priests being allowed to travel to the colony in 1820. The Church of England was disestablished in the Colony of New South Wales by the Church Act of 1836. Drafted by the Catholic attorney-general John Plunkett, the act established legal equality for Anglicans, Catholics and Presbyterians and was later extended to Methodists.

By the late 19th century approximately a quarter of the population of Australia were Irish Australians. Many were descended from the 40,000 Irish Catholics who were transported as convicts to Australia before 1867. The majority consisted of British and Irish Protestants. The Catholics dominated the labour unions and the Labor Party. The growth of school systems in the late 19th century typically involved religious issues, pitting Protestants against Catholics. The issue of independence for Ireland was long a sore point, until the matter was resolved by the Irish War of Independence.

Limited freedom of belief is protected by Section 116 of the Constitution of Australia, but sectarianism in Australia was prominent (though generally nonviolent) in the 20th century, flaring during the First World War, again reflecting Ireland's place within the Empire, and the Catholic minority remained subject to discrimination and suspicion. During the First World War, the Irish gave support for the war effort and comprised 20% of the army in France. However, the labour unions and the Irish in particular, strongly opposed conscription, and in alliance with like-minded farmers, defeated it in national plebiscites in 1916 and 1917. The Anglicans in particular talked of Catholic "disloyalty". By the 1920s, Australia had its first Catholic prime minister.

During the 1950s, the split in the Australian Labor Party between allies and opponents of the Catholic anti-Communist B.A. Santamaria meant that the party (in Victoria and Queensland more than elsewhere) was effectively divided between pro-Catholic and anti-Catholic elements. As a result of such disunity the ALP was defeated at every single national election between 1955 and 1972. In the late 20th century, the Catholic Church replaced the Anglican Church as the largest single Christian body in Australia; and it continues to be so in the 21st century, although it still has fewer members than do the various Protestant churches combined.

While older sectarian divides declined, commentators have observed a re-emergence of anti-Catholicism in Australia in recent decades amid rising secularism and broader anti-Christian movements.

New Zealand
According to New Zealand historian Michael King, the situation in New Zealand has never been as clear as in Australia. Catholics first arrived in New Zealand in 1769, and the Church has had a continuous presence in the country from the time of permanent settlement by Irish Catholics in the 1820s, with the first Maori converted to Catholicism in the 1830s. The signing of the Treaty of Waitangi in 1840, which formalised New Zealand's status as a British colony and instigated substantial immigration from England and Scotland, resulted in the country developing a predominantly Protestant religious character. Nonetheless, French bishop Jean Baptiste Pompallier was able to negotiate the inclusion of a clause guaranteeing freedom of religion in some of the versions of the treaties signed and oral promises during meetings beforehand.

New Zealand has had several Catholic prime ministers, which is indicative of the widespread acceptance of Catholicism within the country; Jim Bolger, who lead the Fourth National Government of the 1990s, was the country's fourth Catholic prime minister; Bill English, who lead the Fifth National Government from 2016 to 2017, was the fifth and most recent. Probably the most notable of New Zealand's Catholic prime ministers was Michael Joseph Savage, an Australian-born trade unionist and social reformer who instigated numerous progressive policies as leader of the First Labour Government of the 1930s.

German Empire

Unification into the German Empire in 1871 saw a country with a Protestant majority and large Catholic minority, speaking German or Polish. Anti-Catholicism was common. The powerful German Chancellor Otto von Bismarcka devout Lutheranforged an alliance with secular liberals in 1871–1878 to launch a Kulturkampf (literally, "culture struggle") especially in Prussia, the largest state in the new German Empire to destroy the political power of the Catholic Church and the Pope. Catholics were numerous in the South (Bavaria, Baden-Wuerttemberg) and west (Rhineland) and fought back. Bismarck intended to end Catholics' loyalty with Rome (ultramontanism) and subordinate all Germans to the power of his state.

Priests and bishops who resisted the Kulturkampf were arrested or removed from their positions. By the height of anti-Catholic legislation, half of the Prussian bishops were in prison or in exile, a quarter of the parishes had no priest, half the monks and nuns had left Prussia, a third of the monasteries and convents were closed, 1800 parish priests were imprisoned or exiled, and thousands of laymen were imprisoned for helping the priests. There were anti-Polish elements in Greater Poland and Silesia. The Catholics refused to comply; they strengthened their Centre Party.

Pius IX died in 1878 and was replaced by more conciliatory Pope Leo XIII who negotiated away most of the anti-Catholic laws beginning in 1880. Bismark himself broke with the anti-Catholic Liberals and worked with the Catholic Centre Party to fight Socialism. Pope Leo officially declared the end of the Kulturkampf on 23 May 1887.

Nazi Germany

The Catholic Church faced repression in Nazi Germany (1933–1945). Hitler despised the Church even though he had been brought up in a Catholic home. The long-term aim of many Nazis was the de-Christianization of Germany and the establishment of a form of Germanic paganism which would replace Christianity. however Richard J. Evans writes that Hitler believed that in the long run National Socialism and religion would not be able to co-exist, stressing repeatedly that Nazism was a secular ideology, founded on modern science: "Science, he declared, would easily destroy the last remaining vestiges of superstition". Germany could not tolerate the intervention of foreign influences such as the Pope and "Priests, he said, were 'black bugs', 'abortions in black cassocks. Nazi ideology desired the subordination of the Church to the State and could not accept an autonomous establishment, whose legitimacy did not spring from the government. From the beginning, the Catholic Church faced general persecution, regimentation and oppression. Aggressive anti-Church radicals like Alfred Rosenberg and Martin Bormann saw the conflict with the Churches as a priority concern, and anti-Church and anti-clerical sentiments were strong among grassroots party activists. To many Nazis, Catholics were suspected of insufficient patriotism, or even of disloyalty to the Fatherland, and of serving the interests of "sinister alien forces".

Adolf Hitler had some regard for the organisational power of Catholicism, but towards its teachings he showed nothing but the sharpest hostility, calling them "the systematic cultivation of the human failure": To Hitler, Christianity was a religion that was only fit for slaves and he detested its ethics. Alan Bullock wrote: "Its teaching, he declared, was a rebellion against the natural law of selection by struggle and the survival of the fittest". For political reasons, Hitler was prepared to restrain his anti-clericalism, seeing danger in strengthening the Church by persecuting it, but he intended to wage a show-down against it after the war. Joseph Goebbels, the Minister for Propaganda, led the Nazi persecution of the Catholic clergy and wrote that there was "an insoluble opposition between the Christian and a heroic-German world view". Hitler's chosen deputy, Martin Bormann, was a rigid guardian of Nazi orthodoxy and saw Christianity and Nazism as "incompatible", as did the official Nazi philosopher, Alfred Rosenberg, who wrote in Myth of the Twentieth Century (1930) that the Catholic Church were among the chief enemies of the Germans. In 1934, the Sanctum Officium put Rosenberg's book on the Index Librorum Prohibitorum (forbidden books list of the Church) for scorning and rejecting "all dogmas of the Catholic Church, indeed the very fundamentals of the Christian religion".

The Nazis claimed that they had jurisdiction over all collective and social activities and based on their claim, they infiltrated all collective and social institutions, interfered in all of the activities which they performed, and banned them if they did not become Nazified, including Catholic schools, youth groups, workers' clubs and cultural societies. Hitler moved quickly to eliminate Political Catholicism, rounding up members of the Catholic aligned Bavarian People's Party and Catholic Centre Party, which ceased to exist in early July 1933. Vice Chancellor Papen meanwhile, amid continuing molestation of Catholic clergy and organisations, negotiated a Reich concordat with the Holy See, which prohibited clergy from participating in politics. Hitler then proceeded to close all Catholic institutions whose functions were not strictly religious:

Almost immediately after agreeing the Concordat, the Nazis promulgated their sterilization law, an offensive policy in the eyes of the Catholic Church and moved to dissolve the Catholic Youth League. Clergy, nuns and lay leaders began to be targeted, leading to thousands of arrests over the ensuing years, often on trumped up charges of currency smuggling or "immorality". In Hitler's Night of the Long Knives purge, Erich Klausener, the head of Catholic Action, was assassinated. Adalbert Probst, national director of the Catholic Youth Sports Association, Fritz Gerlich, editor of Munich's Catholic weekly and Edgar Jung, one of the authors of the Marburg speech, were among the other Catholic opposition figures killed in the purge.

By 1937, the Church hierarchy in Germany, which had initially attempted to co-operate with the new government, had become highly disillusioned. In March, Pope Pius XI issued the Mit brennender Sorge encyclicalaccusing the Nazis of violations of the Concordat, and of sowing the "tares of suspicion, discord, hatred, calumny, of secret and open fundamental hostility to Christ and His Church". The Pope noted on the horizon the "threatening storm clouds" of religious wars of extermination over Germany. The Nazis responded with, an intensification of the Church Struggle. There were mass arrests of clergy and Church presses were expropriated. Goebbels renewed the regime's crackdown and propaganda against Catholics. By 1939 all Catholic denominational schools had been disbanded or converted to public facilities. By 1941, all Church press had been banned.

Later Catholic protests included the 22 March 1942 pastoral letter by the German bishops on "The Struggle against Christianity and the Church". About 30 per cent of Catholic priests were disciplined by police during the Nazi era. In effort to counter the strength and influence of spiritual resistance, the security services monitored Catholic clergy very closelyinstructing that agents monitor every diocese, that the bishops' reports to the Vatican should be obtained and that bishops' activities be discovered and reported. Priests were frequently denounced, arrested, or sent to concentration campsmany to the dedicated clergy barracks at Dachau. Of a total of 2,720 clergy imprisoned at Dachau, some 2,579 (or 95%) were Catholic. Nazi policy towards the Church was at its most severe in the territories it annexed to Greater Germany, where the Nazis set about systematically dismantling the Churcharresting its leaders, exiling its clergymen, closing its churches, monasteries and convents. Many clergymen were murdered.

Netherlands

The independence of the Netherlands from Spanish rule led to the formation of a majority Protestant country in which the dominant form of Protestantism was Calvinism. In Amsterdam, Catholic priests were driven out of the city and following the Dutch takeover, all Catholic churches were converted into Protestant churches. Amsterdam's relationship with the Catholic Church was not normalized until the 20th century.

Nordic countries

Norway

After the dissolution of Denmark-Norway in 1814, the new Norwegian Constitution of 1814, did not grant religious freedom, as it stated that both Jews and Jesuits were denied entrance to the Kingdom of Norway. It also stated that attendance in a Lutheran church was compulsory, effectively banning Catholics. The ban on Catholicism was lifted in 1842, and the ban on Jews was lifted in 1851. At first, there were multiple restrictions on the practice of Catholicism by Norwegians and only foreign citizens were freely allowed to practice it. The first post-reformation parish was founded in 1843, Catholics were only allowed to celebrate Mass in this one parish. In 1845 most of the restrictions on the practice of non-Lutheran Christianity were lifted, and Catholics were now allowed to freely practice their religion, but Monasticism and the Jesuits were not allowed in the country until 1897 and 1956 respectively.

Swedish Empire

During the period of great power in Sweden, conversions to Catholicism were punished with fines or imprisonment and in exceptional cases, death. Sweden during the Thirty Years War saw itself as the protector of Protestantism in all of Europe against the pope. The Linköping Bloodbath of 20 March 1600 saw several prominent Catholic nobles beheaded by order of King Charles IX of Sweden. The executions were partially motivated by the Polish invasion of Sweden and a threat of a potential Catholic takeover under Polish king Sigismund III Vasa, who planned to reconvert Sweden back to Catholicism. The Battle of Stångebro prevented Sigismund from conquering and reconverting Sweden. Catholic nobles were put in a majority of leading positions by Sigismund In the Swedish government without the approval of the Swedish people or parliament. The conspiracy provoked new laws preventing Catholics from holding leading government positions in the Swedish government. Due to the Austrian emperor winning a lot of great victories before Sweden joined. The war and Swedish successes cemented Protestantism's continued survival in the Holy Roman Empire and the following anti-Catholicism ingrained in the religion.

Gustavus Adolphus of Sweden was known as the "Lion from the North". He did prevent the pillaging of Catholic villages of Swedish troops by proclaiming Protestant moral superiority in 1631, while Catholic armies were plundering Saxony. He did not wear any armour during the Battle of Rain against the Catholics and proclaimed he was divinely chosen by God to lead the Protestants to glory, and so felt he needed no protection in battle.
Russian Orthodox populations had the right to practice their faith since their incorporation in 1617 after the Ingrian War and never faced similar persecution. Even after Eastern Orthodoxy was legalized, there remained an extreme anti-Catholic sentiment in Sweden which was widely supported by German nobility and German Protestants in Swedish territories.

Only in 1781 did Catholics have the right to worship once again in Sweden, the latest of all major religions except Judaism that was legalized in the same era, even though Judaism had already been in practice tolerated since Charles XII of Sweden brought Muslim and Jewish advisors with him from the Ottoman Empire. While Protestant Swedes could not join any other religious organization until 1873, still, in 1849, Catholic converts were punished with imprisonment. Conversion to Catholicism was punished with fines or imprisonment even after the reform. Catholics could not become a minister of the Swedish government or work as teachers or nurses in Sweden until 1951.

United States

John Higham described anti-Catholicism as "the most luxuriant, tenacious tradition of paranoiac agitation in American history."
 Jenkins, Philip. The New Anti-Catholicism: The Last Acceptable Prejudice (Oxford University Press, New ed. 2004). British anti-Catholicism was exported to the United States. Two types of anti-Catholic rhetoric existed in colonial society. The first, which was derived from the heritage of the Protestant Reformation and the religious wars of the sixteenth century, consisted of the "Anti-Christ" and the "Whore of Babylon" variety and it dominated Anti-Catholic thought until the late seventeenth century. The second was a more secular variety which focused on the supposed intrigue of the Catholics and accused them of plotting to extend medieval despotism worldwide.

Historian Arthur Schlesinger Sr. has called anti-Catholicism "the deepest-held bias in the history of the American people".

Historian Joseph G. Mannard says that wars reduced anti-Catholicism: "enough Catholics supported the War for Independence to erase many old myths about the inherently treasonable nature of Catholicism.... During the Civil War the heavy enlistments of Irish and Germans into the Union Army helped to dispel notions of immigrant and Catholic disloyalty."

Colonial era
American anti-Catholicism has its origins in the Protestant Reformation which generated anti-Catholic propaganda for various political and dynastic reasons. Because the Protestant Reformation justified itself as an effort to correct what it perceived were the errors and the excesses of the Catholic Church, it formed strong positions against the Catholic bishops and the Papacy in particular. These positions were brought to New England by English colonists who were predominantly Puritans. They opposed not only the Catholic Church but also the Church of England which, due to its perpetuation of some Catholic doctrines and practices, was deemed insufficiently "reformed". Furthermore, English and Scottish identity to a large extent was based on opposition to Catholicism. "To be English was to be anti-Catholic," writes Robert Curran.

Because many of the British colonists, such as the Puritans and Congregationalists, were fleeing religious persecution by the Church of England, much of early American religious culture exhibited the more extreme anti-Catholic bias of these Protestant denominations. Monsignor John Tracy Ellis wrote that a "universal anti-Catholic bias was brought to Jamestown in 1607 and vigorously cultivated in all the thirteen colonies from Massachusetts to Georgia". Colonial charters and laws often contained specific proscriptions against Catholics. For example, the second Massachusetts charter of October 7, 1691, decreed "that forever hereafter there shall be liberty of conscience allowed in the worship of God to all Christians, except Papists, inhabiting, or which shall inhabit or be resident within, such Province or Territory". Historians have only identified one Catholic who lived in colonial BostonAnn Glover. She was hanged as a witch in 1688, four years before the much more famous witchcraft trials in nearby Salem.

Monsignor Ellis noted that a common hatred of the Catholic Church could unite Anglican clerics and Puritan ministers despite their differences and conflicts. One of the Intolerable Acts passed by the British Parliament that helped fuel the American Revolution was the Quebec Act of 1774, which granted freedom of worship to Roman Catholics in Canada.

New nation
The patriot reliance on Catholic France for military, financial and diplomatic aid led to a sharp drop in anti-Catholic rhetoric. Indeed, the king replaced the pope as the demon patriots had to fight against. Anti-Catholicism remained strong among loyalists, some of whom went to Canada after the war while most remained in the new nation. By the 1780s, Catholics were extended legal toleration in all of the New England states that previously had been so hostile. "In the midst of war and crisis, New Englanders gave up not only their allegiance to Britain but one of their most dearly held prejudices."

George Washington was a vigorous promoter of tolerance for all religious denominations as commander of the army (1775–1783) where he suppressed anti-Catholic celebrations in the Army and appealed to French Catholics in Canada to join the American Revolution; a few hundred of them did. Likewise he guaranteed a high degree of freedom of religion as president (1789–1797), when he often attended services of different denominations. The military alliance with Catholic France in 1778 changed attitudes radically in Boston. Local leaders enthusiastically welcomed French naval and military officers, realizing the alliance was critical to winning independence. The Catholic chaplain of the French army reported in 1781 that he was continually receiving "new civilities" from the best families in Boston; he also noted that "the people in general retain their own prejudices." By 1790, about 500 Catholics in Boston formed the first Catholic Church there.

Fear of the pope agitated some of America's Founding Fathers. For example, in 1788, John Jay urged the New York Legislature to prohibit Catholics from holding office. The legislature refused, but did pass a law designed to reach the same goal by requiring all office-holders to renounce foreign authorities "in all matters ecclesiastical as well as civil". Thomas Jefferson, looking at the Catholic Church in France, wrote, "History, I believe, furnishes no example of a priest-ridden people maintaining a free civil government", and "In every country and in every age, the priest has been hostile to liberty. He is always in alliance with the despot, abetting his abuses in return for protection to his own."

1840s–1850s
Anti-Catholic fears reached a peak in the nineteenth century when the Protestant population became alarmed by the influx of Catholic immigrants. Some Protestant ministers preached the belief that the Catholic Church is the Whore of Babylon which is described in the Book of Revelation. The resulting "nativist" movement, which achieved prominence in the 1840s, was whipped into a frenzy of anti-Catholicism that led to mob violence, most notably the Philadelphia Nativist Riot of 1844. Historian David Montgomery argues that the Irish Catholic Democrats in Philadelphia had successfully appealed to the upper-class Whig leadership. The Whigs wanted to split the Democratic coalition, so they approved Bishop Kendrick's request that Catholic children be allowed to use their own Bible. That approval outraged the evangelical Protestant leadership, which rallied its support in Philadelphia and nationwide. Montgomery states:
The school controversy, however, had united 94 leading clergymen of the city in a common pledge to strengthen Protestant education and "awaken the attention of the community to the dangers which... threaten these United States from the assaults of Romanism." The American Tract Society took up the battle cry and launched a national crusade to save the nation from the "spiritual despotism" of Rome. The whole Protestant edifice of churches, Bible societies, temperance societies, and missionary agencies was thus interposed against Catholic electoral maneuvers ... at the very moment when those maneuvers were enjoying some success.

The nativist movement found expression in a national political movement called the "American" or Know-Nothing Party of 1854–1856. It had considerable success in local and state elections in 1854–55 by emphasizing nativism and warning against Catholics and immigrants. It nominated former president Millard Fillmore as its presidential candidate in the 1856 election. However, Fillmore was not anti-Catholic or nativist; his campaign concentrated almost entirely on national unity. Historian Tyler Anbinder says, "The American party had dropped nativism from its agenda." Fillmore won 22% of the national popular vote.

In the Orange Riots in New York City in 1871 and 1872, Irish Catholics violently attacked Irish Protestants, who carried orange banners.

Anti-Catholicism among American Jews further intensified in the 1850s during the international controversy over the Edgardo Mortara case, when a baptized Jewish boy in the Papal States was removed from his family and refused to return to them.

After 1875 many states passed constitutional provisions, called "Blaine Amendments", forbidding tax money be used to fund parochial schools. In 2002, the United States Supreme Court partially vitiated these amendments, when they ruled that vouchers were constitutional if tax dollars followed a child to a school even if the school were religious.

A favorite rhetorical device in the 1870s was using the code words for Catholicism: "superstition, ambition and ignorance".  President Ulysses Grant in a major speech to veterans in October 1875 warned that America again faced an enemy: religious schools.  Grant saw another civil war in the "near future": it would not be between North and South, but will be between "patriotism and intelligence on the one side and superstition, ambition and ignorance on the other."  According to historian Charles W. Calhoun, "at various points in his life, Grant had bristled privately at what he considered religious communicants' thralldom to a domineering clergy, but he did not specifically mention Catholicism in his speech. Still, Catholic journals decried the president's seeming exploitation of religious bigotry."  In his December 1875 Annual Message to Congress, Grant urged taxation on "vast amounts of untaxed church property" which Professor John McGreevey says was "a transparently anti-Catholic measure since only the Catholic Church owned vast amounts of propertyin schools, orphanages, and charitable institutions".  Grant told Congress such legislation would protect American citizens from tyranny "whether directed by the demagogue or by priestcraft."

20th and 21st centuries

Anti-Catholicism played a major role in the defeat of Al Smith, the Democratic nominee for president in 1928. Smith did very well in Catholic precincts, but he did poorly in the South, as well as among the Lutherans of the North. His candidacy was also hampered by his close ties to the notorious Tammany Hall political machine in New York City and his strong opposition to prohibition. His cause was uphill in any case, because he faced a popular Republican leadership in a year of peace and unprecedented prosperity.

The passage of the 18th Amendment in 1919, a culmination of a half-century of anti-liquor agitation, also fueled anti-Catholic sentiment. Prohibition enjoyed strong support among dry pietistic Protestants, and equally strong opposition by wet Catholics, Episcopalians, and German Lutherans. The drys focused their distrust on the Catholics who showed little popular support for the enforcement of prohibition laws, and when the Great Depression began in 1929, there was increasing sentiment that the government needed the tax revenue which the repeal of Prohibition would bring.

Over 10 million Protestant soldiers who served in World War II came into close contact with Catholic soldiers; they got along well and, after the war, they played a central role in spreading a greater level of ethnic and religious tolerance for Catholics among other white Americans. Although anti-Catholic sentiment declined in the U.S. in the 1960s, particularly after John F. Kennedy became the first Catholic U.S. president, traces of it persist in both the media and popular culture. In March, 2000, the Catholic League criticized Slate magazine and journalist Jack Shafer for a piece the League described as taking "delight in justifying anti-Catholicism." Anti-Catholic hate crimes against persons and property have also continued to occur. The summer of 2020 saw a wave of anti-Catholic acts which ranged from the vandalization of churches and cathedrals; to the destruction and often the decapitation of statues, particularly statues of St Junipero Serra, Mary, and Jesus; Illinois, and Florida. Many of these acts are tied to other political movements, most notably the QAnon movement, though other far right groups have also espoused anti-Catholic sentiment. One popular conspiracy is that the three stars on the DC flag stand for London, the Vatican and Washington. Another far right  conspiracy claims the pope was arrested for sexual abuse.

In primarily Catholic countries
Anti-clericalism is a historical movement that opposes religious (generally Catholic) institutional power and influence in all aspects of public and political life, and the involvement of religion in the everyday life of the citizen. It suggests a more active and partisan role than mere laïcité. The goal of anticlericalism is sometimes to reduce religion to a purely private belief-system with no public profile or influence. However, many times it has included outright suppression of all aspects of faith.

Anticlericalism has at times been violent, leading to murders and the desecration, destruction and seizure of Church property. Anticlericalism in one form or another has existed throughout most of Christian history, and it is considered to be one of the major popular forces underlying the 16th century reformation. Some of the philosophers of the Enlightenment, including Voltaire, continually attacked the Catholic Church, both its leadership and its priests, claiming that many of its clergy were morally corrupt. These assaults in part led to the suppression of the Jesuits, and played a major part in the wholesale attacks on the very existence of the Church during the French Revolution in the Reign of Terror and the program of dechristianization. Similar attacks on the Church occurred in Mexico and Portugal since their 1910 revolutions and in Spain during the twentieth century.

Argentina
In 1954, Argentina saw extensive destruction of churches, denunciations of clergy and confiscation of Catholic schools as Juan Perón attempted to extend state control over national institutions such as the Catholic Church in Argentina.

Austria

Holy Roman Empire

Holy Roman Emperor Joseph II (emperor 1765–1790) opposed what he called "contemplative" religious institutionsreclusive Catholic institutions that he perceived as doing nothing positive for the community. Although Joseph II was himself a Catholic, he also believed in firm state control of ecclesiastical matters outside of the strictly religious sphere and decreed that Austrian bishops could not communicate directly with the Roman Curia. His policies are included in what is called Josephinism, that promoted the subjection of the Catholic Church in the Habsburg lands to service for the state.

Austro-Hungary
Georg Ritter von Schönerer (1842–1921) was an Austrian landowner and politician of Austro-Hungary. He was a major opponent of political Catholicism and the founder of the movement Away from Rome!, aimed the conversion of all the Catholic German-speaking population of Austria to Lutheranism, or, in some cases, to the Old Catholic Churches.

Brazil

Brazil has the largest number of Catholics in the world, and as a result, it has not experienced any large anti-Catholic movements.

During the Nineteenth Century, the Religious Issue was the name given to the crisis when Freemasons in the Brazilian government imprisoned two Catholic bishops for enforcing the Church's prohibition against Freemasonry.

Even during times in which the Church was experiencing intense conservatism, such as the era of the Brazilian military dictatorship, anti-Catholicism was not advocated by the left-wing movements (instead, Liberation theology gained force). However, with the growing number of Protestants (especially Neo-Pentecostals) in the country, anti-Catholicism has gained strength. A pivotal moment during the rise of anti-Catholicism was the kicking of the saint episode in 1995. However, owing to the protests of the Catholic majority, the perpetrator was transferred to South Africa for the duration of the controversy.

During the COVID-19 pandemic in Brazil, drug dealers took advantage of the pandemic to unite five slums in Rio de Janeiro imposing evangelical Protestantism on the area and attacking Catholics (and also members of Umbanda).

Colombia

Anti-Catholic and anti-clerical sentiments, some of which were spurred by an anti-clerical conspiracy theory which was circulating in Colombia during the mid-twentieth century, led to the persecution and killing of Catholics, most specifically, the persecution and killing of members of the Catholic clergy, during the events which are known as La Violencia.

Cuba
Cuba, under the rule of the atheist Fidel Castro, succeeded in reducing the ability of the Catholic Church to work by deporting one archbishop and 150 Spanish priests, by discriminating against Catholics in public life and education and refusing to accept them as members of the Communist Party. The subsequent flight of 300,000 Cubans from the island also helped to diminish the Church there.

France

During the French Revolution (1789–1795), the clergy and the laity were persecuted and Church property was confiscated and destroyed by the new government as part of a process of Dechristianization, the aims of which were the destruction of Catholic practices and the destruction of the very faith itself, culminating in the imposition of the atheistic Cult of Reason followed by the imposition of the deistic Cult of the Supreme Being. The persecution led Catholics who lived in the west of France to wage a counterrevolution, the War in the Vendée, and when the state was victorious, it killed tens of thousands of Catholics. A few historians have called the killings a genocide. However, most historians believe that the killings constituted a brutal crackdown against political enemies rather than a genocide. The French invasions of Italy (1796–1799) included an assault on Rome and the exile of Pope Pius VI in 1798.

Relations improved in 1802 when Napoleon came to terms with the Pope in the Concordat of 1801. It allowed the Church to operate but did not give back the lands; it proved satisfactory for a century. By 1815 the Papacy supported the growing alliance against Napoleon, and was re-instated as the State Church during the conservative Bourbon Restoration of 1815–1830. The brief French Revolution of 1848 again opposed the Church, but the Second French Empire (1851–1871) gave it full support. The history of 1789–1871 had established two campsthe left against the Church and the right supporting itthat largely continued until the Vatican II process in 1962–1965.

France's Third Republic (1871–1940) was cemented by anti-clericalism, the desire to secularise the State and social life, faithful to the French Revolution. This was the position of the radicals and socialists. in 1902 Émile Combes became Minister of the Interior, and the main energy of the government was devoted to an anti-clerical agenda. The parties of the Left, Socialists and Radicals, united upon this question in the Bloc republicain, supported Combes in his application of the law of 1901 on the religious associations, and voted the new bill on the congregations (1904). By 1904, through his efforts, nearly 10,000 religious schools had been closed and thousands of priests and nuns left France rather than be persecuted. Under his guidance parliament moved toward the 1905 French law on the separation of Church and State, which ended the Napoleonic arrangement of 1801.

In the Affaire Des Fiches, in France in 1904–1905, it was discovered that the militantly anticlerical War Minister under Combes, General Louis André, was determining promotions based on the French Masonic Grand Orient's huge card index on public officials, detailing which were Catholic and who attended Mass, with the goal of preventing their promotions. Exposure almost caused the government to fall; instead Combes retired.

Italy

In the Napoleonic era, anti-clericalism was a powerful political force. From 1860 through 1870, the new Italian government, under the House of Savoy, outlawed all religious orders, both male and female, including the Franciscans, the Dominicans and the Jesuits, closed down their monasteries and confiscated their property, and imprisoned or banished bishops who opposed this (see Kulturkampf). Italy took over Rome in 1870 when it lost its French protection; the Pope declared himself a prisoner in the Vatican. Relations were finally normalized in 1929 with the Lateran Treaty.

Mexico
Following the Reform War, President Benito Juárez issued a decree nationalizing Church properties, separating Church and State, and suppressing religious orders.

In the wake of the Mexican Revolution, the Mexican Constitution of 1917 contained further anti-clerical provisions. Article 3 called for secular education in the schools and prohibited the Church from engaging in primary education; Article 5 outlawed monastic orders; Article 24 forbade public worship outside the confines of churches; and Article 27 placed restrictions on the right of religious organizations to hold property. Article 130 deprived clergy members of political rights.

Mexican President Plutarco Elías Calles's strict enforcement of previous anti-clerical legislation denying priests' rights, enacted as the Calles Law, prompted the Mexican Episcopate to suspend all Catholic worship in Mexico from August 1, 1926, and sparked the bloody Cristero War of 1926–1929 in which some 50,000 peasants took up arms against the government. Their slogan was "¡Viva Cristo Rey!" (Long live Christ the King!).

The effects of the war on the Church were profound. Between 1926 and 1934 at least 40 priests were killed. Where there were 4,500 priests serving the people before the rebellion, in 1934 there were only 334 priests licensed by the government to serve fifteen million people, the rest having been eliminated by emigration, expulsion, assassination or not obtaining licenses. It appears that ten states were left without any priests. Other sources indicate that the persecution was such that, by 1935, 17 states had no registered priests.

Some of the Catholic casualties of this struggle are known as the Saints of the Cristero War. Events relating to this were famously portrayed in the novel The Power and the Glory by Graham Greene.

Poland

For the situation in Russian Poland, see Anticatholicism in Russian Empire

Catholicism in Poland, the religion of the vast majority of the population, was severely persecuted during World War II, following the Nazi invasion of the country and its subsequent annexation into Germany. Over 3 million Catholics of Polish descent were murdered during the Invasion of Poland, including 3 bishops, 52 priests, 26 monks, 3 seminarians, 8 nuns and 9 lay people, later beatified in 1999 by Pope John Paul II as the 108 Martyrs of World War II.

The Roman Catholic Church was even more violently suppressed in Reichsgau Wartheland and the General Government. Churches were closed, and clergy were deported, imprisoned, or killed, among them was Maximilian Kolbe, a Pole of German descent. Between 1939 and 1945, 2,935 members of the Polish clergy (18%) were killed in concentration camps. In the city of Chełmno, for example, 48% of the Catholic clergy were killed.

Catholicism continued to be persecuted under the Communist regime from the 1950s. Contemporary Stalinist ideology claimed that the Church and religion in general were about to disintegrate. Initially, Archbishop Wyszyński entered into an agreement with the Communist authorities, which was signed on 14 February 1950 by the Polish episcopate and the government. The Agreement regulated the matters of the Church in Poland. However, in May of that year, the Sejm breached the Agreement by passing a law for the confiscation of Church property.

On 12 January 1953, Wyszyński was elevated to the rank of cardinal by Pius XII as another wave of persecution began in Poland. When the bishops voiced their opposition to state interference in ecclesiastical appointments, mass trials and the internment of priests beganthe cardinal being one of its victims. On 25 September 1953 he was imprisoned at Grudziądz, and later placed under house arrest in monasteries in Prudnik near Opole and in Komańcza Monastery in the Bieszczady Mountains. He was released on 26 October 1956.

Pope John Paul II, who was born in Poland as Karol Wojtyla, often cited the persecution of Polish Catholics in his stance against Communism.

Spain
Anti-clericalism in Spain at the start of the Spanish Civil War resulted in the killing of almost 7,000 clergy, the destruction of hundreds of churches and the persecution of lay people in Spain's Red Terror. Hundreds of Martyrs of the Spanish Civil War have been beatified and hundreds more in October 2007.

In mixed Catholic-Protestant countries

Switzerland
The Jesuits (Societas Jesu) were banned from all activities in either clerical or pedagogical functions by Article 51 of the Swiss constitution in 1848. The reason for the ban was the perceived threat to the stability of the state resulting from Jesuit advocacy of traditional Catholicism; it followed the Roman Catholic cantons forming an unconstitutional separate alliance leading to civil war. In June 1973, 55% of Swiss voters approved removing the ban on the Jesuits (as well as Article 52 which banned monasteries and convents from Switzerland). (See Kulturkampf and Religion in Switzerland)

In primarily Orthodox countries

Byzantine Empire 
In the East–West Schism of 1054 the Eastern Orthodox Church and the Catholic Church broke their full communion with each other because of Ecclesiastical differences, Theological, and Liturgical disputes.

In April 1182, the Eastern Orthodox population of the Byzantine Empire committed a large-scale massacre against the Catholic population of Constantinople, this massacre is known as the Massacre of the Latins and it further worsened relations and increased enmity between Eastern Orthodoxy and Catholicism.

Russian Empire 

During Russian rule, Catholics, primarily Poles and Lithuanians, suffered great persecution not only because of their ethnic-national background, but also for religious reasons. Especially after the uprisings of 1831 and 1863, and within the process of Russification (understanding that there is a strong link between religion and nationality), the tsarist authorities were anxious to promote the conversion of these peoples to the official faith, intervening in public education in those regions (an Orthodox religious education was compulsory) and censoring the actions of the Catholic Church. In particular, attention was focused on the public actions of the Church, such as masses or funerals, because they could serve as the focus of protests against the occupation. Many priests were imprisoned or deported because of their activities in defense of their religion and ethnicity. In the late nineteenth century, however, there was a progressive relaxation of the control of Catholic institutions by the Russian authorities.

Former Yugoslavia

During World War II in Yugoslavia, the Chetniks killed an estimated 18,000–

32,000 Croats, who were mostly Roman Catholic. The terror tactics against the Croats were, to at least an extent, a reaction to the terror carried out by the Ustaše against Serbs. Along with mass murder, the Ustashe conducted religious persecution of Serbs that included a policy of forced conversion from Eastern Orthodoxy to Roman Catholicism, often with the participation of local Catholic priests. However, the largest Chetnik massacres took place in eastern Bosnia where they preceded any significant Ustashe operations. Croats (and Muslims) living in areas intended to be part of Greater Serbia were to be cleansed of non-Serbs regardless, in accordance with Mihailović's directive of 20 December 1941. About 300 villages and small towns were destroyed, along with a large number of mosques and Catholic churches. Fifty-two Catholic priests were killed by Chetniks throughout the war. A number of Catholic nuns were also raped and killed, including the killing of several nuns from Goražde in December 1941.

During the war in Croatia, the ICTY determined that ethnic Croats were persecuted on political, racial and religious grounds, as part of a general campaign of killings and forced-removals of Croat civilians. This included the deliberate destruction of religious buildings and monuments. Approximately 450 Catholic churches were destroyed or severely damaged, with another 250 suffering lesser damages. In addition, approximately 151 rectories, 31 monasteries, and 57 cemeteries were destroyed or severely damaged.  While another 269 religious buildings were destroyed during the Bosnian War.

Ukraine

In the separatist region known as the Donetsk People's Republic, the government has declared that the Russian Orthodox Church of the Moscow Patriarchate is the state religion, and Protestant churches have been occupied by paramilitaries. Jehovah's Witnesses have lost their property, and their Kingdom Halls have been occupied by rebels in the Donetsk and Luhansk regions. Roman Catholic, Greek Catholic, Ukrainian Orthodox, and Protestant clergy have been kidnapped by groups such as the Russian Orthodox Army, and they have also been accused of opposing Russian Orthodox values. Human Rights Watch says that the bodies of several members of the Church of the Transfiguration were found in a mass grave in 2014.

Non-Christian nations

Bangladesh

On 3 June 2001, nine people were killed by a bomb explosion at a Roman Catholic church in the Gopalganj District.

Burkina Faso 

On May 12, 2019, six Catholics including a priest were killed by gunmen who rode on motorcycles and stormed a church in Dablo during a Sunday morning mass.  A day later, on May 13, 2019, four people were killed and a statue of the Virgin Mary was destroyed by armed men in an attack on Catholic parishioners during a religious procession in the remote village of Zimtenga.

China

The Daoguang Emperor modified an existing law, making the spread of Catholicism punishable by death.
During the Boxer Rebellion, Catholic missionaries and their families were murdered by Boxer rebels. During the 1905 Tibetan Rebellion, Tibetan rebels murdered Catholics and Tibetan converts.

Since the founding of the People's Republic of China, all religions including Catholicism only operate under state control. However, many Catholics do not accept State control of the Church and as a result, they worship clandestinely. There has been some rapprochement between the Chinese government and the Vatican.

Chinese Christians have reportedly been persecuted in both official and unsanctioned churches. In 2018, the Associated Press reported that China's paramount leader Xi Jinping "is waging the most severe systematic suppression of Christianity in the country since religious freedom was written into the Chinese constitution in 1982", which has involved "destroying crosses, burning bibles, shutting churches and ordering followers to sign papers renouncing their faith".

Japan

On 5 February 1597 a group of twenty-six Catholics were killed on the orders of Toyotomi Hideyoshi.
During the Tokugawa Shogunate, Japanese Catholics were suppressed, leading to an armed rebellion during the 1630s. After the rebellion was crushed, Catholicism was further suppressed and many Japanese Catholics went underground. Catholicism was not openly restored to Japan until the 1850s.

North Korea

South Korea

Catholic priests and nuns have been arrested and harassed for protesting against the construction of the Jeju Island Naval Base.

Sri Lanka

Government actions 
In Sri Lanka, A Buddhist-influenced government took over 600 parish schools in 1960 without compensation and secularized them. Attempts were made by future governments to restore some autonomy.

Anti-Catholic violence 

Since 2000, in a context of rising violence against religious minorities, i.e. Christians, Muslims and Hindus, multiple attacks on Catholic churches occurred. For instance, in 2009, a mob of 1,000 smashed the interior of a church in the town of Crooswatta, assaulting parishioners with clubs, swords and stones, forcing several of them to be treated in hospitals. In 2013, vandals smashed a statue of the Virgin Mary as well as a tabernacle, and they also tried to burn the Eucharist at a church in Angulana, near Colombo.

The term "anti-Catholic Catholic" has come to be applied to Catholics who are perceived to view the Catholic Church with animosity. Traditionalist or conservative Catholics frequently use it as a descriptive term for modernist or liberal Catholics, especially those modernist or liberal Catholics who seek to reform Church doctrine, make secularist critiques of the Catholic Church, or place secular principles above Church teachings. Those who take issue with the Catholic theology of sexuality are especially prone to be given this label.

Suppression of the Jesuits

Prime Minister Pombal of Portugal was aggressively hostile to the Jesuit order because it reported to an Italian powerthe Popeand it also tried to operate independently rather than operate under the control of the government. In Portugal as well as in much of Catholic Europe, he waged a full-scale war against the Jesuits. The Jesuit order was suppressed in the Portuguese Empire (1759), France (1764), the Two Sicilies, Malta, Parma, the Spanish Empire (1767), and Austria and Hungary (1782). The Pope himself suppressed the order everywhere in 1773, but it survived in Russia and Prussia. The suppression of the Jesuits was a major blow to Catholic education across Europe, with nearly 1000 secondary schools and seminaries were shut down. Their lands, buildings, and endowments were confiscated; their teachers were scattered. Although Jesuit education had become old fashioned in Poland and other areas, it was the main educational support network for Catholic intellectuals, senior clergy, and prominent families. Governments unsuccessfully attempted to replace all of those schools, but there were far too few non-clerical teachers who were suitable.

The Jesuit order was restored by the pope in 1814 and it flourished in terms of rebuilding schools and educational institutions but it never regained its enormous political power. The suppression of the Jesuits has been described as "an unmitigated disaster for Catholicism." The political weakness of the once-powerful institution was on public display for more ridicule and bullying. The Church lost its best educational system, its best missionary system, and its most innovative thinkers. Intellectually, it would take two centuries for the Church to fully recover.

In popular culture

Anti-Catholic stereotypes are a long-standing feature of English literature, popular fiction, and pornography. Gothic fiction is particularly rich in this regard. Lustful priests, cruel abbesses, immured nuns, and sadistic inquisitors appear in such works as The Italian by Ann Radcliffe, The Monk by Matthew Lewis, Melmoth the Wanderer by Charles Maturin and "The Pit and the Pendulum" by Edgar Allan Poe.

See also
Anti-Papalism
Black Legend
Catholic revival
History of Christianity
History of the Catholic Church
History of the Eastern Orthodox Church
History of Protestantism
Protestant Revolutionary Propaganda
The Great Apostasy
Persecution of Christians
Persecution of Christians by Christians
Sectarian violence among Christians

References

Sources

Further reading

 Anbinder, Tyler. Nativism and Slavery: The Northern Know Nothings and the Politics of the 1850s 1992; in U.S.
 
 Bennett, David H. The Party of Fear: From Nativist Movements to the New Right in American History University of North Carolina Press, 1988
 Blanshard, Paul. American Freedom and Catholic Power Beacon Press, 1949; famous attack on Catholicism
 Brown, Thomas M. "The Image of the Beast: Anti-Papal Rhetoric in Colonial America", in Richard O. Curry and Thomas M. Brown, eds., Conspiracy: The Fear of Subversion in American History (1972), 1–20.
 Bruce, Steve. No Pope of Rome: Anti-Catholicism in Modern Scotland (Edinburgh, 1985).
 
 Cogliano, Francis D. No King, No Popery: Anti-Catholicism in Revolutionary New England Greenwood Press, 1995
 Cruz, Joel Morales. The Mexican Reformation: Catholic Pluralism, Enlightenment Religion, and the Iglesia de Jesus Movement in Benito Juarez's Mexico (1859–72) (Wipf and Stock Publishers, 2011).
 
 
 Greeley, Andrew M. An Ugly Little Secret: Anti-Catholicism in North America 1977.
 Henry, David. "Senator John F. Kennedy Encounters the Religious Question: I Am Not the Catholic Candidate for President." in Contemporary American Public Discourse Ed. H. R. Ryan. Prospect Heights, IL: Waveland Press, Inc., 1992. 177–193.
 Higham; John. Strangers in the Land: Patterns of American Nativism, 1860–1925 1955
 
 Hostetler; Michael J. "Gov. Al Smith Confronts the Catholic Question: The Rhetorical Legacy of the 1928 Campaign," Communication Quarterly (1998) 46#1 pp 12+.
 Jensen, Richard. The Winning of the Midwest: Social and Political Conflict, 1888–1896 (1971)
 Joskowicz, Ari. The Modernity of Others: Jewish Anti-Catholicism in Germany and France (Stanford University Press; 2013) 376 pages; how Jewish intellectuals defined themselves as modern against the anti-modern positions of the Catholic Church
 Latourette, Kenneth Scott. Christianity in a Revolutionary Age (5 vol 1969), covers 1790s to 1960; comprehensive global history
 
 Keating, Karl. Catholicism and FundamentalismThe Attack on "Romanism" by "Bible Christians" (Ignatius Press, 1988). 
 Lehner, Ulrich and Michael Printy, eds. A Companion to the Catholic Enlightenment in Europe (2010)
 
 Moore; Leonard J. Citizen Klansmen: The Ku Klux Klan in Indiana, 1921–1928 University of North Carolina Press, 1991
 Mourret, Fernand. History Of The Catholic Church (8 vol, 1931) comprehensive history to 1878. country by country. online free; by French Catholic priest; see vols. 6-7-8.
 
 
 Thiemann, Ronald F. Religion in Public Life Georgetown University Press, 1996.
 
 
 Wolffe, John, ed., Protestant-Catholic Conflict from the Reformation to the Twenty-first Century (Palgrave Macmillan UK, 2013). Table of contents
 Wolffe, John. "A Comparative Historical Categorisation of Anti‐Catholicism." Journal of Religious History 39.2 (2015): 182–202. online free

External links 

 Observatory on Intolerance and Discrimination Against Christians in Europe

 
Anti-Catholic organizations
Anti-Christian sentiment
Anti-clericalism
Catholic studies
Christianity and other religions
Criticism of the Catholic Church
Persecution of Catholics
Relations between Christian denominations